Hemsworth is a civil parish in the metropolitan borough of the City of Wakefield, West Yorkshire, England.  The parish contains eleven listed buildings that are recorded in the National Heritage List for England.  All the listed buildings are designated at Grade II, the lowest of the three grades, which is applied to "buildings of national importance and special interest".  The parish contains the town of Hemsworth, the village of Fitzwilliam, and the surrounding countryside.  Most of the listed buildings are houses and associated structures, and the others consist of a church, a public house, and three mileposts.


Buildings

References

Citations

Sources

 

Lists of listed buildings in West Yorkshire